Bridging the Gap is the second studio album by Charlie Wilson, a member of the R&B group The Gap Band. The album debuted at #184 on the Billboard 200 and managed to peak at #152 on the chart. To date, the album has sold 197,000 copies in the United States.

Track listing

Charts

References

External links
 
 Bridging The Gap at Discogs
 Official website
 Facebook Page
 My Space Page
 Charlie Wilson in-depth interview by Pete Lewis, 'Blues & Soul' August 2011

2000 albums
Charlie Wilson (singer) albums
Interscope Records albums